Hughes School District 27  was a public school district based in Hughes, Arkansas, United States until it closed in Summer 2015 due to declining enrollment.

The school district encompassed  of land in St. Francis County and Crittenden County. It included Hughes, Horseshoe Lake, and the St. Francis County section of Jennette.

History

Prior to desegregation circa 1970, white and black children attended separate schools.

Sheryl Owens became superintendent in 2013. She was the final person to hold the position of superintendent and the first African American woman in the Hughes district to do so.

Enrollment decline and closure
According to Owens, circa 1996 enrollments declined gradually, and then around 2006 became severe. Owens stated that prospective teachers were wary of going to work for a district that could be forcefully consolidated in the future, and so the district had issues with recruitment. Under Arkansas law Act 60, the state can forcefully merge a school district which has fewer than 350 total students for a consecutive period of two years with another school district.

The Hughes district had, in the 2012-2013 and 2013-2014 school years, 348 students and 344 students, making it eligible to be merged. As the state determined that the district had financial problems, it was not eligible to apply for a waiver to stay open under House Bill 1263. In the 2014–2015 school year the Hughes district created a petition asking for a consolidation with the Forrest City School District, one which the district community anticipated would allow Hughes to keep an elementary school. However the Forrest City district stopped supporting the petition. The reason cited was that the Forrest City district was afraid of lawsuits surrounding the Hughes district. On April 9, 2015, the Arkansas Board of Education voted to consolidate the Hughes district with the West Memphis School District.

Post-closure
The West Memphis district took possession of the buildings, then gave them to the Hughes municipal government in 2016. Denisa R. Superville of Education Week stated that "The squat, brick buildings that were part of the Hughes district are in various stages of disrepair." The high school gymnasium was leased at no cost to the police chief, who made it into an after school center.

Former Hughes board member Lincoln Barnett stated that several area businesses, as a result of the district closure, encountered financial problems. Hughes School District, in its existence, employed the largest number of people in Hughes.

Demographics 
In the 2014–2015 school year the district had 318 students. There were students in the area who instead attended other Arkansas school districts or private schools, with many white students in private school. The percentage of Hughes school district students allowed to have free or reduced lunches, a sign of poverty, was 94%.

Academic performance 
In 2014 the percentage of students passing benchmarks in state examinations in math and English reading was 45.8%.

In the 2014-2015 year the state ranked the school district as "needs improvement", the second lowest rating.

Schools 
The schools' mascot and athletic emblem was the Blue Devil with royal blue and white as the school colors.
 Mildred Jackson Elementary School, served prekindergarten through grade 6.
 In the Jim Crow period it served as the school for black children. In 2015 the State of Arkansas gave the school a "D" rating in its accountability rules.
 Hughes High School, served grades 7 through 12.

References

Further reading
 2006-2007 School District Map
 Map of Arkansas School Districts pre-July 1, 2004
  (Download) - Includes boundaries of the Hughes district in the 1950s
  (Download) - Includes boundaries of the Hughes district in the 1950s

External links
 
 

Education in Crittenden County, Arkansas
Education in St. Francis County, Arkansas
Defunct school districts in Arkansas
2015 disestablishments in Arkansas
School districts disestablished in 2015